The 1998 PSA Men's Mahindra World Open Squash Championship is the men's edition of the 1998 World Open, which serves as the individual world championship for squash players. The event took place in Doha in Qatar from 27 November to 5 December 1998. Jonathon Power won his first World Open title, defeating Peter Nicol in the final.

Seeds

Draw and results

Finals

Top half

Section 1

Section 2

Bottom half

Section 1

Section 2

See also
PSA World Open
1998 Women's World Open Squash Championship

References

External links
World Open on paderborner-squash-club.de
World Squash History

World Squash Championships
M
1998 in Qatari sport
20th century in Doha
Squash tournaments in Qatar
Sports competitions in Doha
International sports competitions hosted by Qatar